Campbell Crest is a peak rising to  at the west end of the Bowditch Crests, Bermel Peninsula, on the Bowman Coast of Graham Land on the Antarctic Peninsula. The feature is the highest point in the Bowditch Crests and appears in aerial photographs taken by Sir Hubert Wilkins in 1928 and Lincoln Ellsworth in 1935. It was roughly mapped from the Ellsworth photographs by W.L.G. Joerg in 1937, and later photographed from the air by the United States Antarctic Service in 1940 and the U.S. Navy in 1966. It was surveyed by the Falkland Islands Dependencies Survey in 1958. It was named by the UK Antarctic Place-Names Committee in 1993 after Jon C. Campbell. Campbell was a geographer with the U.S. Geological Survey (USGS) from 1981, a USGS member in the International GPS Campaign at McMurdo Station, Byrd Station, and South Pole Station from 1991-92 (he conducted developmental GPS geodetic surveys from USCGC Polar Sea at Mount Siple and Pine Island Bay), and the secretary for the Advisory Committee on Antarctic Names under the U.S. Board on Geographic Names since 1993

References
 

Mountains of Graham Land
Bowman Coast